The Gem City Bowl was an all-star college football game played at Erie Veterans Memorial Stadium in Erie, Pennsylvania, in 1958, 1959, 1960, 1961, 1962 and 1964, typically on Thanksgiving Day.

The East / West squads were made up of outstanding seniors from the Big Ten, Mid-American Conference, Pennsylvania State Conference, Mid-Atlantic Conference, and players from Independent schools east of the Mississippi River.

The game was discontinued following the 1964 season due to poor ticket sales.

Game results
Six Gem City Bowl games were played. East won 4 games, West won 2 games.

Gem City Bowl

See also
 List of college bowl games

References

External links
 Gem City Bowl – All-Star Football Game at University at Buffalo Libraries Sports History Collection

Defunct college football bowls